Bodil in Danish and Norwegian, in Swedish also the variations Bothild, Botilda, and Boel, is a feminine given name. It is Latinized form of Old Norse Bóthildr from bót "remedy" + hildr "battle". Older variations include Botill, Botild, Botilla, and Botyld.

The Swedish name day for Bodil and for Boel is 26 January.

People with the name include:
 Bodil Arnesen (born 1967), Norwegian operatic soprano 
 Bodil Katharine Biørn (1871–1960), Norwegian missionary
 Bodil Begtrup (1903-1987), Denmark's first female ambassador
 Bodil Branner (born 1948), Danish mathematician
 Bodil Cappelen (born 1930), Norwegian painter, textile artist, and book illustrator
 Bodil Dybdal (1901–1992), Danish lawyer and judge
 Bodil Finsveen (1934–2008), Norwegian politician
 Bodil Hauschildt (1861–1951), Danish photographer 
 Bodil Hellfach (1856–1941), Danish nurse 
 Bodil Holmström (born 1981), Finnish orienteering competitor
 Bodil Ipsen (1889–1964), Danish actress and film director
 Bodil Joensen (1944–1985), Danish pornographic actress
 Bodil Jørgensen (born 1961), Danish film actress
 Bodil Kaalund (1930–2016), Danish painter, textile artist, and writer
 Bodil Kjær (born 1932), Danish architect, furniture designer, and professor
 Bodil Kjer (1917–2003), Danish actress
 Bodil Koch (1903–1972), Danish politician
 Bodil Kornbek (born 1961), Danish politician
 Bodil Malmsten (born 1944), Swedish poet and novelist
 Bodil Mårtensson (born 1952), Swedish author 
 Bodil Niska (born 1954), Norwegian jazz musician
 Bodil Rasmussen (born 1957), Danish rower
 Bodil Rosing (1877–1941), Danish-American actress
 Bodil Russ (1908–1998), Norwegian equestrian
 Bodil Ryste (born 1979), Norwegian ski mountaineer and cross-country skier
 Bodil Schmidt-Nielsen (1918–2015), Danish-American physiologist
 Bodil Thirstedt (born 1916), Danish sprint canoer
 Bodil Udsen (1925–2008), Danish actress
 Bodil Valero (born 1958), Swedish politician

References

Feminine given names
Danish feminine given names
Norwegian feminine given names
Swedish feminine given names
Scandinavian feminine given names